Andre Levins, also known as A+ (born August 29, 1981, 
Hempstead, New York) is an American rapper. As a teenager he released albums in 1996 and in 1999.

History
A+ began his music career in 1995, after winning a national talent competition sponsored by Def Jam Records. 
He was the first act signed to Kedar Massenburg's record label, Kedar Entertainment. According to Massenburg, the A+ moniker "means that he's striving for perfection, and he's not really talking about the same things as other young rappers." In 1996, at the age of 14, A+ released his first album, The Latch-Key Child, which featured contributions from Prodigy and Q-Tip. 
"All I See" was chosen as the lead single, and it peaked at number 66 on the Billboard Hot 100 chart, staying for 14 weeks.

His second album, Hempstead High, was released in February 1999. 
Guest appearances on the album included DeBarge, the Lost Boyz and Canibus. 
The single "Enjoy Yourself", which sampled the 1976 Walter Murphy song "A Fifth of Beethoven", 
reached the top five of the UK Singles Chart, number 63 of the US Hot 100 for three weeks,) and was also commercially successful in Germany and Japan.

Discography

Albums

Singles

References 

1981 births
African-American male rappers
Living people
People from Hempstead (village), New York
People from Long Island
Rappers from New York City
Universal Motown Records artists
21st-century African-American people
20th-century African-American people

de:A+